Hockey Homicide is a cartoon made by Walt Disney Productions in 1945, featuring Goofy.

Plot
Narrator Doodles Weaver explains the rules of ice hockey in satirical format.  The narration's emphasis on good sportsmanship is countered by the violence of the players (all of them "played" by Goofy). Team captains Ice Box Bertino and Fearless Ferguson are rivals who brutally fight each other and incur a penalty before the game can begin, sending both of them to the penalty box; subsequently, they are constantly released from the box only to be sent back to it as they cannot help but fight each other on the ice. Eventually, confusion over many extra hockey pucks after they whack the referee and make him drop all his pucks, leads the players and spectators to get into a massive brawl, during which snippets from other Disney cartoons (including Pinocchio, How to Play Football, How to Play Baseball, and Victory Through Air Power) are included to emphasize the mass confusion. Meanwhile, the Loose Leafs' and the Ant Eaters' team members have mingled together peacefully to rest and eat high in the stands, with the closing narration implying that they irritate each other's fans into fighting so the players themselves can watch instead.

Home media
The short was released on December 2, 2002, on Walt Disney Treasures: The Complete Goofy.

References

External links 
 

1945 films
1945 animated films
1940s Disney animated short films
Goofy (Disney) short films
American ice hockey films
Sports animation
Films directed by Jack Kinney
Films produced by Walt Disney
Films scored by Paul Smith (film and television composer)
American sports comedy films
1940s sports comedy films
1945 short films
1945 comedy films